Jocelyn West (formerly Jocelyn Montgomery) is a British musician and actress.

West was one of the founding members of the band Miranda Sex Garden. After leaving the band in the early 1990s, she joined the medieval music ensemble Sinfonye. In 1998, West sang songs written by Hildegard von Bingen for her debut solo album Lux Vivens that was produced by David Lynch. In 2009, West published her second solo album Salt Bird, the first under her new name Jocelyn West.

References

British women singers
Living people
Year of birth missing (living people)
Place of birth missing (living people)